KACC is an album-oriented rock (AOR) formatted radio station based in Alvin, Texas, broadcasting on 89.7 FM in the Greater Houston area. It is under ownership of Alvin Community College. The station serves the Alvin and Brazoria County area, but also covers beyond those borders.

KACC was originally a volunteer radio station that became a part of the RTV curriculum at Alvin Community College. Founder Cathy Forsythe (1956–2007) was instrumental in making KACC a part of the Alvin/Brazoria County landscape, and was one of the original founders of the radio station.

The station was previously managed by Mark Moss, who stepped down from the position of Station Manager in 2020. His tenure lasted 28 years. The Station Manager position is currently vacant.

The programming at KACC consists of current, classic, and local rock and roll. Occasionally the station will play other types of music to support local artists, and from time to time will air local high school sports. The current location of the KACC studios is across the street from Alvin Community College, but there are plans to move the radio station to  a much smaller facility on the main campus.

The request line is (281) 756-3897.

External links
KACC 89.7 FM official website

ACC
Album-oriented rock radio stations in the United States
ACC
Radio stations established in 1978